{{Infobox militant organization
| name             = Khalistan Commando Force
| caption          = Letterhead logo of the KCF during the leadership of Labh Singh
| logo             = Letterhead logo of the Khalistan Commando Force (KCF) during the tenure of Labh Singh.jpg
| leader           = Manbir Singh Chaheru (1987)Labh Singh (1987–1988)Kanwaljit Singh Sultanwind (1988–1989)Paramjit Singh Panjwar
| motives          = The creation of a Sikh independent state of Khalistan through defense weapons.
| dates            = 1985-2011
| area             = India
| ideology         = 
| status           = 
|

The Khalistan Commando Force (KCF) is a militant Khalistani organisation operating in the state of Punjab with prominent members based in Canada, the United Kingdom and Pakistan. Its objective is the creation of a Sikh independent state of Khalistan through armed struggle. According to the US State Department, and the Assistant Inspector General of the Punjab Police Intelligence Division, the KCF was responsible for many assassinations in India, including the 1995 assassination of Punjab Chief Minister Beant Singh. India has declared and banned KCF as a terrorist organisation.

Objective
The creation of a Sikh independent state of Khalistan through armed struggle is their primary goal. KCF primarily targeted Indian security forces including CRPF, BSF and other police forces. It targeted Hindus who were against the Khalistan movement. The primary source of funding of KCF is looting, bank robbery and extortion. It is also involved in large scale smuggling of weapons from Pakistan to India across the International border.

Formation and leadership 
The Khalistan Commando Force was founded by Manbir Singh Chaheru in August 1986.

The group later broke into multiple factions.

On 8 August 1986, Punjab Police arrested Manbir Singh Chaheru ("Hari Singh"), and he was eventually killed or disappeared while in police custody. After Chaheru was arrested, former police officer Sukhdev Singh, also known as Sukha Sipahi, took command of the KCF. Sukhdev Singh changed his name to Labh Singh and  assumed the title of "General".

After his death the KCF was headed by Kanwarjit Singh Sultanwind
On 18 October 1989, Kanwarjit Singh Sultanwind, and another two KCF members were arrested by police near Jalandhar. While one member managed to escape, Kanwarjit Singh Sultanwind, then 23 years old, swallowed a cyanide capsule to avoid giving information about the group.

Decline 
Operation Black Thunder against the Sikh militants in Golden Temple greatly degraded the capability of KCF to conduct operations. Police killed Labh Singh on 12 July 1988.
His loss damaged the organisation. After his death, the Khalistan Commando Force split into factions including those led by Wassan Singh Zaffarwal, Paramjit Singh Panjwar and Gurjant Singh Rajasthani.

Another result of Labh Singh's death was the failure of the Khalistan Commando Force - Babbar Khalsa alliance, as the relationship established by Labh Singh and Sukhdev Singh Babbar was lost.

Police and other Indian security forces caught or killed Lieutenant Generals and Area Commanders, and eventually crushed many of the factions.

Activities

1980s 
The organisation battled Indian military forces, especially in revenge for Operation Blue Star, the government's 1984 military operation in the Harimandir Sahib (Golden Temple) in Amritsar.

It assassinated General Arun Vaidya, who led the Indian forces in Operation Blue Star.

It also attacked sellers of alcohol, cigarettes, and other items prohibited by conservative Sikhism.

Sikh militants from Khalistan Commando Force attacked two buses. They singled out and killed 34 Hindu bus passengers in 1987 Haryana killings.

1990s 
After the major defeats of the KCF in the late 1980s, the group continued its struggle into the 1990s.

A June 1991 attack on a passenger train in northwestern Punjab killed about fifty, mostly Hindu, passengers.

A September 1993 bombing in New Delhi targeting Indian Youth Congress president Maninderjeet Singh Bitta that killed eight people.

On 9 October 1992, Harjinder Singh Jinda and Sukhdev Singh Sukha, alleged assassins of General Arun Vaidya, were hanged until death in Pune jail.

The KCF was listed in 1995 one of the 4 "major militant groups" in the Khalistan movement.

2000s 
In June 2006 a member of the Panjwar faction of the KCF, Kulbir Singh Barapind was extradited from the US to India. He was deported to India for belonging to a terrorist organisation and for entering the United States with a false passport. He was wanted in India for thirty-two cases, but was arrested for three murders in the early 1990s. After his arrest, he stated that he would renew the Khalistan movement through peaceful means.

The investigation began in 2003, when Khalid Awan, jailed at the time for credit card fraud, bragged of his relationship with Paramjeet Singh Panjwar, leader of the KCF. Awan was given a 14-year prison sentence in 2007 on terrorism charges.

In 2008, Punjab Police announced they had foiled a KCF effort to kill Gurmeet Ram Rahim Singh, head of Dera Sacha Sauda.

Status 
Paramjeet Singh Panjwar remained the head of the remaining faction of the KCF as of 2008, and was listed at that time as one of the top 10 most wanted criminals in India. As per the released statement of Khalid Awan - a Canadian citizen - who served 14-year sentence in the U.S. prisons for transferring money to KCF, Panjwar is a VIP in Pakistan and has the support of Pakistan's Inter-Services Intelligence agency. On the other hand, the U.S prosecutors have claimed that Awan admitted of transferring money to Panjwar despite knowing the fact that the money will be used to carry out attacks against India.

The University of Maryland beta version of the "Global Terrorism Database" has recorded 2 attacks on military targets, 9 attacks on police or other government targets, and 9 attacks against civilian, religious, transportation or educational entities, in both India and Pakistan, as of June 2009.

The KCF remains banned in India under the Unlawful Activities (Prevention) Act and designated as terrorist organisation by the Government of India.

A 2011 NPR report claimed a person associated with this group was imprisoned in a highly restrictive Communication Management Unit in the US.

See also 
 Sikh extremism
 Kharku
 Babbar Khalsa
 International Sikh Youth Federation
 Khalistan Liberation Force
 Khalistan Zindabad Force

References 

Paramilitary organisations based in India
Pro-Khalistan militant outfits
Sikh terrorism
Organisations designated as terrorist by India
Organizations based in Asia designated as terrorist
1986 establishments in Punjab, India